This article describes the squads for the 2022 CECAFA Women's Championship.

The age listed for each player is in May 2022, the first day of the tournament. The numbers of caps and goals listed for each player do not include any matches played after the start of the tournament. The club listed is the club for which the player last played a competitive match prior to the tournament. A flag is included for coaches who are of a different nationality than their own national team.

Group A

Burundi
Head coach:  Gustave Niyonkuru

Djibouti
Head coach:   Hassan kako

Rwanda
Head coach:  Sosthenes Habimana

Uganda
Head coach:  George Lutalo

Group B

Ethiopia
Head coach: Frew Hailegbrael

South Sudan
Head coach: Shilene Booysen

Tanzania
Head coach: Oscar Mirambo

Zanzibar
Head coach:

References

2022 in women's association football
CECAFA Women's Championship
CECAFE
2022 in African football
International association football competitions hosted by Uganda